Norske Skog Follum is a paper mill located in Follum in Norway. The mill is part of the Norske Skog Corporation and opened in 1873 with the name Follum Fabrikker (also Follum træsliberi). It has three paper machines and produces 410,000 tonnes of newsprint annually.

The paper is transported by railway to Oslo Harbor where it is shipped out.

History
Follum Fabrikker was started in 1873 and operated as a separate company until it was purchased by Norske Skog in 1989. In 1995 PM7 went through a major renovation.

External links
 Corporate web site
 Corporate entry on Follum

Pulp and paper mills in Norway
Norske Skog
Hønefoss
1873 establishments in Norway
Companies established in 1873
Companies based in Ringerike (municipality)